Michel Der Zakarian (born on 18 February 1963) is an Armenian football manager and former professional player who played as a defender He is the currently manager of Ligue 1 club Montpellier.

Raised in France, he played for Nantes and Montpellier, and earned five caps for the Armenia national team in the mid-1990s. As a manager, he led Nantes, Montpellier (two spells each) and Brest in Ligue 1, and Clermont and Reims in Ligue 2.

Playing career
Der Zakarian lived in France from a young age (he was raised in Marseille) and spent his entire professional career in the country with Nantes and Montpellier, winning the league with the former in 1983. He was a member of the Armenia national team, participating in five international matches after his debut in a home 1998 World Cup qualifying match against Portugal.

Managerial career

Nantes and Clermont
Der Zakarian was assistant to Georges Eo at Nantes, and succeeded him on 12 February 2007 when the team was 19th in Ligue 1; this was their fifth change of the position since winning the league title in 2001. The Canaris were relegated, and he brought them back immediately from Ligue 2 as runners up to Le Havre, but was sacked on 26 August 2008 after gaining one point from the first three games of the season, and was replaced by Alain Perrin.

On 1 June 2009, Der Zakarian succeeded Didier Ollé-Nicolle at Ligue 2 club Clermont. Despite the club having one of the lowest budgets in the league, he led them to respective finishes of 6th, 7th and 5th in his three seasons before returning to Nantes. 

In 2012–13, his first season back at the Stade de la Beaujoire, Der Zakarian again won Nantes promotion to Ligue 1, in third place. He kept them in the top flight in each of the following three seasons, though goals were hard to come by; they netted 38, 29 and 33 respectively over the 38-game campaigns. Club owner Waldemar Kita disliked Der Zakarian and his management, but allowed him to see out his contract instead of paying for a dismissal.

Reims and Montpellier
Der Zakarian left Nantes in May 2016 to sign for two years at Reims, newly relegated to Ligue 2. A year later, he was back in the top flight after leaving by mutual accord to join Montpellier.

In April 2019, Der Zakarian signed a new contract to stay at Montpellier until 2021. The club ended that season in 6th, missing out on UEFA Europa League qualification only due to the results of the domestic cup finals.

Der Zakarian announced in May 2021 that he was leaving Montpellier at the end of the season. He won 2–1 against former club Nantes on his final day, securing 8th place.

Brest
On 22 June 2021, Der Zakarian signed with fellow Ligue 1 side Brest. The team did not win any of their first 11 games, followed by six successive victories including over Monaco and Marseille. Having stayed up in his first season, his contract was automatically extended to 2024.

Der Zakarian was fired on 11 October 2022 with the club in last place, having won once in ten games. Results that season included a 7–0 home loss to Montpellier on 28 August.

Return to Montpellier
On 8 February 2023 Der Zakarian returned as manager of Montpellier HSC.

Personal life
Der Zakarian and his wife Véronique married in 1983.

Managerial statistics

Honours
Nantes
Ligue 1: 1982–83
Coupe de France runners-up: 1982–83

Montpellier
Coupe de France: 1989–90; runners-up: 1993–94
Coupe de la Ligue: 1991–92; runners-up: 1993–94

References

External links

1963 births
Living people
Footballers from Yerevan
Association football defenders
Armenian footballers
Armenia international footballers
Armenian emigrants to France
FC Nantes players
Montpellier HSC players
Ligue 1 players
Armenian football managers
FC Nantes managers
Clermont Foot managers
Stade de Reims managers
Montpellier HSC managers
Stade Brestois 29 managers
Soviet emigrants to France
Ligue 1 managers
Ligue 2 managers
French footballers
French football managers
Footballers from Marseille